{
  "type": "FeatureCollection",
  "features": [
    {
      "type": "Feature",
      "properties": {},
      "geometry": {
        "type": "Polygon",
        "coordinates": [
          [
            [
              -0.01506328582763672,
              51.5432124143317
            ],
            [
              -0.012595653533935549,
              51.54393304110636
            ],
            [
              -0.010128021240234377,
              51.5429188223739
            ],
            [
              -0.007081031799316407,
              51.5408235884089
            ],
            [
              -0.007424354553222657,
              51.54059671015294
            ],
            [
              -0.01506328582763672,
              51.5432124143317
            ]
          ]
        ]
      }
    }
  ]
}

International Quarter London (also known as IQL, The International Quarter and TIQ) is a business development project built by Lendlease and commercial developer LCR in a subdivision of Stratford, London, England. It is located between the site of the Westfield Stratford City shopping centre and the Queen Elizabeth Olympic Park. The postcode designations are part of E20. Endeavour Square is part of the International Quarter.

Construction 
Construction began in 2014 and is ongoing , with an estimated cost of £2.1 billion currently.

The code names, designated by the plots being occupied for the most significant buildings were "S5" and "S6", now primarily occupied by the Financial Conduct Authority (FCA) and Transport for London (TfL) respectively.

Planning permission was granted for International Quarter London North in 2017 and the first buildings were designated code names "N22" and "N21". following the publishing of the design development report.

Segmentation 
The International Quarter spans two core areas, South and North.

IQL South 
IQL South was the first to be developed and is partially occupied, with parts still under construction. It is located between Westfield Stratford City and Queen Elizabeth Olympic Park.

IQL North 
IQL North was the second core area to be developed. It received planning permission in 2017 and received building code names "N22" and "N21" by the architects, Rogers Stirk Harbour + Partners (RSHP). The site is located between Penny Brookes Street and International Way, north of Westfield Stratford City.

Tenants

Current commercial office tenants 

Current tenants include:
 The Financial Conduct Authority currently occupies number 12 Endeavour Square.
 Transport for London currently occupies number 5 Endeavour Square.
 UNICEF

Whilst UNICEF are located inside Endeavour Square, their primary entrance is through 1 Westfield Avenue, occupying the top five floors of the FCA building at number 12 Endeavour Square. Some key tenants have connected shared infrastructure with the extended Westfield Stratford City campus, including badge access, fire and safety systems.

Retail units 
There are a number of retail units occupied by Pret a Manger, Tonkotsu and an independent cafe, whilst the others remain unoccupied or are in the process of being fitted out.

Future commercial office tenants 

, bespoke building construction is underway for future tenants, including:
 Cancer Research UK
 The British Council
 HMRC expected in late 2020, at number 14 Westfield Avenue.

References 

Stratford, London
Buildings and structures in the London Borough of Newham
Office buildings in London
Redevelopment projects in London